Hayri Gür Arena,  Pelitli Arena is an indoor sporting arena and multi-purpose venue located in the suburban town of Pelitli, Trabzon Province, Turkey.

Built between 2009 and 2010 at a cost of  23 million (approx. $ 14 million), the venue was initially designed for a seating capacity of 5,000, however, it was later extended to hold 7,500 spectators. In the beginning, it was called Pelitli Arena from the location of the venue. Later, the arena was renamed Hayri Gür to honor Trabzonspor's first coach and long-time board member, who died in 2010 at age of 98.

The building has two training halls, rooms for health care, doping test and press. In addition, there are social and leisure facilities. The arena's parking lot can hold 456 cars.

Completed in 2011, The venue is home to the basketball team of Trabzonspor Basketball. It hosted the basketball matches for boys during the 2011 European Youth Summer Olympic Festival.

Organizations
2011 European Youth Summer Olympic Festival

References

External links
 Hayri Gür Sport Hall
 Hayri Gür'ün ardından

Sports venues completed in 2010
Basketball venues in Turkey
Turkish Basketball League venues
Indoor arenas in Turkey